La storia del fornaretto di Venezia is a 1952 Italian historical drama film.

Cast
Doris Duranti as Bianca Sormani 
Mariella Lotti as  Anna Loredan 
Paolo Carlini	 as  Marco Loredan
Renato Chiantoni 	 as  Il servo di Loredan
Attilio Dottesio	 as  L'avogadore 
Loris Gizzi	 as  Don Fulgenzio 
Arnoldo Foà
Vira Silenti
Marco Vicario
Isarco Ravaioli
Sergio Bergonzelli

External links
 

1952 films
1950s Italian-language films
Italian historical drama films
1950s historical drama films
Italian black-and-white films
1950s Italian films